Spackman is an English surname. Notable people with the surname include:

Carol Spackman Moss, American politician
Charles Spackman (1891–1969), English recipient of the Victoria Cross
Charles Spackman Barker (1806–1879), British inventor and organ builder
Isaac Spackman (d. 1771), English painter and illustrator
Kerry Spackman (b. 1956), New Zealand cognitive neuroscientist
Marc Spackman (b. 1979), English Olympic swimmer
Nigel Spackman (b. 1960), English football manager
Victoria Spackman, New Zealand creative director and business executive
W. M. Spackman (1905–1990), American writer

English-language surnames